Jonathan Westmass (born July 3, 1981) is a Trinidadian former footballer who played in the Canadian Professional Soccer League, and the USL A-League.

Career 
Before reaching the professional ranks Westmass began playing college soccer with Hartwick College, where he earned First & Second Team All Conference in 2000, and 2001. He began his professional career in 2002 in the Canadian Professional Soccer League with Vaughan Sun Devils. He made his debut on June 7, 2002 in a match against York Region Shooters.

On July 21, 2003 he was signed by the Toronto Lynx of the USL A-League. He made his debut on August 8, 2003 against Vancouver Whitecaps. During his tenure with Toronto he appeared in 5 matches. In 2007, he returned to the CPSL renamed CSL to sign with the Canadian Lions. In 2010, he returned to former club under the name York Region Shooters.

References 

1981 births
Living people
Trinidad and Tobago footballers
York Region Shooters players
Toronto Lynx players
Brampton United players
A-League (1995–2004) players
Canadian Soccer League (1998–present) players
Association football forwards